Gioacchino Caracausi (born 8 June 1945) is an Italian weightlifter. He competed in the men's middleweight event at the 1968 Summer Olympics.

References

1945 births
Living people
Italian male weightlifters
Olympic weightlifters of Italy
Weightlifters at the 1968 Summer Olympics
Sportspeople from Palermo
20th-century Italian people